Neolecta vitellina is a species of fungus belonging to the family Neolectaceae.

It has cosmopolitan distribution.

References

Ascomycota